Albuquerque Air Route Traffic Control Center (ZAB) is located at 8000 Louisiana Boulevard, Albuquerque, New Mexico, United States. The Albuquerque ARTCC is one of 22 Air Route Traffic Control Centers in the United States.

The primary responsibility is the separation of overflights, and the expedited sequencing of arrivals and departures along STARs (Standard Terminal Arrival Routes) and SIDs (Standard Instrument Departures) for the airspace over most of Arizona and New Mexico, as well as parts of Colorado, Oklahoma, and Texas.

ZAB covers an area that includes one class Bravo airport.
 Phoenix Sky Harbor International Airport (PHX) in Phoenix, AZ

ZAB also includes five class Charlie airports.
 Albuquerque International Sunport (ABQ) in Albuquerque, NM
 El Paso International Airport (ELP) in El Paso, TX
 Rick Husband Amarillo International Airport (AMA) in Amarillo, TX
 Tucson International Airport (TUS) in Tucson, AZ
 Davis Monthan Air Force Base (DMA) in Tucson, AZ

Control location

Subdivision 
ZAB's airspace is divided both geographically and altitudinally.

ZAB's primary subdivisions are known as specialties. There are five different specialties known as the North, East, Southeast, Southwest and Northwest.  Each specialty is broken down further into 7 or 8 sectors.

By altitude, ZAB comprises 39 sectors (6 ultra-high sectors, 17 high-altitude sectors, 12 low-altitude sectors, and 4 low-high sectors).  The vertical strata of these sectors vary greatly depending on the terrain, the geographic location covered, and the variety of traffic the controllers work.

North specialty

 *SANLO (16) | SANDIA | 132.8/346.35 | SFC - FL280
 LAVLO (17) | LAVAN | 124.325/288.25 | SFC - FL280
 BLKUH (58) | BLACK ROCK | 126.925/353.85 | FL370+
 ABQHI (68) | ALBUQUERQUE | 134.6/251.15 | FL290 - FL360
 OTOHI (79) | OTTO | 118.65/269.475 | FL370+
 GUPHI (93) | GALLUP | 120.55/285.4 | FL290 - FL360
 CNXLH (94) | CORONA | 133.65/284.6 | SFC - FL360

East specialty 
 *BGDLO (15) | BORGER | 127.85/285.475 | SFC - FL280
 PANHI (70) | ESPAN | 120.95/263.1 | FL290+
 KENHI (71) | KENTO | 133.05/269.35 | FL290 - FL360
 CIMUH (72) | CIMARRON | 128.225/291.6 | FL370+
 LVSHI (95) | LAS VEGAS | 125.075/279.5 | FL290 - FL360
 TCCHI (96) | TUCUMCARI | 128.675/360.8 | FL370+
 AMAHI (97) | AMARILLO | 134.75/239.25 | FL290 - FL360
 DHTUH (98) | DALHART | 132.125/307.05 | FL370+

Southeast specialty 
 DMNLO (19) | DEMING | 128.2/285.5 | SFC - FL350
 SFLLO (20) | SALT FLAT | 135.875/292.15 | SFC - FL270
 CVSLO (21) | CANNON | 126.85/285.6 | SFC - FL350
 ROWHL (23) | ROSWELL | 132.65/257.6 | SFC+
 *ELPHI (63) | EL PASO | 120.975/278.3 | FL280 - FL350
 FSTUH (78) | FORT STOCKTON | 133.225/270.35 | FL360+
 TXOHI (87) | TEXICO | 132.325/251.1 | FL360+
 SUNHI (89) | SUNLAND | 125.525/269.45 | FL360+

Southwest specialty 
 GBNLO (42) | GILA BEND | 126.45/288.3 | SFC - FL250
 TUSLO (46) | TUCSON | 125.4/269.3 | SFC - FL250**
 SVCLO (47) | SILVER CITY | 134.45/327.15 | SFC - FL230
 TFDLO (49) | STANFIELD | 125.25/307.3 | SFC - 11,000'
 PHXUH (65) | PHOENIX | 132.45/371.9 | FL340+
 CIEUH (80) | CIMARRON | 126.225/341.7 | FL340+
 SSOHI (90) | SAN SIMON | 133.0/281.5 | FL240 - FL330
 *GBNHI (91) | GILA BEND | 135.15/350.2 | FL260 - FL330
**except over Sector 49 (12,000' - FL250)

Northwest specialty 
 HIPHI (37) | HIPII | 134.325/259.3/263.05/279.55 | FL240 - FL290
 MIALH (38) | MIAMI | 132.9/239.05 | SFC - FL310
 FOSLH (39) | FOSIL | 135.725/339.8 | SFC - FL310
 *DRKLO (43) | DRAKE | 128.45/298.9 | SFC - FL230
 INWLO (45) | WINSLOW | 127.675/306.2 | SFC - FL290
 PAYHI (50) | PAYSON | 128.125/317.75 | FL320+
 INWHI (67) | WINSLOW | 133.925/282.35 | FL300+
 PRCHI (92) | PRESCOTT | 135.325/370.9 | FL300+

*Mid Shift Sector

References

External links 
 Albuquerque Center Weather Service Unit (CWSU) (NWS/FAA)

Air traffic control centers
Transportation in Albuquerque, New Mexico
WAAS reference stations
Aviation in New Mexico